Pequeños Gigantes may refer to:
 Pequeños Gigantes (Colombian TV series), a Colombian variety and kids drama TV show
 Pequeños Gigantes (Mexican TV series), a Mexican reality talent show
 Pequeños Gigantes USA, a Spanish-language reality talent show